Dendrobium guamense is a species of epiphytic orchid endemic to Guam and the Commonwealth of the Northern Mariana Islands.  It is currently known from nine occurrences totaling 550 individuals across the islands of Guam, Rota, Tinian, and Saipan.

References

guamense
Flora of the Northern Mariana Islands
Flora of Guam
Epiphytes